Uuhraah! is a role-playing game published by Blackhawk Games in 1976.

Description
Uuhraah! is a prehistoric system of cavemen vs. dinosaurs, consisting mainly of simple combat rules.

Publication history
Uuhraah! was designed by Bob King, with art by Greg Bell, and published by Blackhawk Games in 1976 as a 12-page digest-sized book.

Reception
Lawrence Schick described the game as "Crude but enthusiastic."

References

Fantasy role-playing games
Role-playing games introduced in 1976